Ascham may refer to:

 Ascham School

People
Anthony Ascham (c. 1614 – 1650), British academic, political theorist, Parliamentarian and diplomat
Anthony Ascham (astrologer)
Roger Ascham